X-type may refer to:
 Jaguar X-Type, an entry-level luxury car that was manufactured and marketed by Jaguar Cars
 X-type asteroid
 LGOC X-type, an early model of London double-decker bus
 X-type histiocytosis, a clinically well-defined group of cutaneous syndromes characterized by infiltrates of Langerhans cells